The Destination Nunataks are a group of peaks and nunataks,  long and  wide, rising to  at Pyramid Peak and including Sphinx Peak, Andrews Peak, Mummy Ridge, and unnamed nunataks to the northwest, located in northeast Evans Neve,  northwest of the Barker Range, Victoria Land, Antarctica. This group was visited in 1970–71 by a Victoria University of Wellington Antarctic Expedition geological party led by M.G. Laird. The name "Destination Rocks" was originally used for the feature because these nunataks were near the northern limits of Laird's expedition. The name Destination Nunataks, as approved by the New Zealand Antarctic Place-Names Committee and the Advisory Committee on Antarctic Names in 1985, applies to the entire group described rather than to just two nunataks at the southeast end as indicated on some maps. These nunataks lie situated on the Pennell Coast, a portion of Antarctica lying between Cape Williams and Cape Adare.

References 

Nunataks of Victoria Land
Pennell Coast